Madame Tussauds Beijing (北京杜莎夫人蜡像馆) is the Beijing branch of Madame Tussauds wax museum. It is situated at No. 18, Pedestrian Street, Qianmen Avenue, an entertainment district in Beijing. It offers a mix of Chinese and western figures, from film stars to athletes and world leaders.

Notable Figures

References 

Beijing
Tourist attractions in Beijing
Museums in Beijing
2014 establishments in China
Museums established in 2014